Tegut (styled tegut…) is a Swiss-owned supermarket chain based in Fulda, Germany, which operates 275 stores across seven of Germany's Bundesländer, namely in Hesse, Thuringia, Bavaria, Rhineland-Palatinate, Saxony-Anhalt, Lower Saxony and Baden-Württemberg. In early January 2013 it was bought by Migros.

History 
The company was founded in 1947 by Theo Gutberlet under the name Thegu, derived from the first letters of his first and surname, which was later renamed in 1955 to Tegut. From 1961, the bigger supermarkets were called HaWeGe (an acronym for HandelsWarenGesellschaft) and from 1973, the smaller stores Okay! In 1972, Tegut established a subsidiary called kff Kurhessische Fleischwaren GmbH which still produces Tegut's meat products. It was in 1998 that the company changed its name again, to its presently-stylised "tegut…". In August 2009, when he took over from his father Wolfgang, Thomas Gutberlet became the third generation CEO in the company.

Organic food 

Since 1982, Tegut has been involved in the cultivation and marketing of organic food. As of 2008, almost 20% of Tegut's revenue was made from their own-produced organic food, mostly grown in eastern Hesse.

Meat production 
Tegut has an unusual way of creating their meat products – to promote the ripening process, their cold cuts are subjected to classical music by a string quartet.

References

External links 
 www.tegut.com 

Supermarkets of Germany
Retail companies established in 1947
1947 establishments in Germany
Migros